Indira Lynn Scott (born May 27, 1997) is an American fashion model. She closed Dior's F/W 18 Haute Couture show in her debut season.

Early life
Scott was born in Jamaica, Queens.

Career
Scott was discovered while working at The Reformation. She has modeled for Dior, Altuzarra, Balmain, SavagexFenty, Michael Kors, Oscar de la Renta, Prabal Gurung, Ralph Lauren, Opening Ceremony, Sonia Rykiel, and Coach New York. She has appeared in V magazine and Office magazine.

She is represented by DNA Models.

Models.com selected Scott as a “Top Newcomer” for her debut season. She also ranks on their "Hot List".

References 

Living people
1997 births
Models from New York City
African-American female models
People from Jamaica, Queens
American female models
21st-century African-American people
21st-century African-American women